Mattias Löw (born 17 September 1970) is a Swedish film director, documentary filmmaker and photographer based in Stockholm and Motala, who specializes in social issues documentaries and documentary photography. He gives lectures and workshops on the topics of storytelling and documentary filmmaking, in addition to occasional acting.

Life and career

Mattias Löw was born in Västerhaninge, Haninge Municipality, Sweden. After high school, he went on to study cinema arts and history at Stockholm University and screenwriting for film and TV at UCLA – University of California, Los Angeles. At UCLA he became interested in documentary filmmaking and eventually started his first production company.

1990s
Beginning his career in the early 1990s as a short film and music video director.

During his studies at UCLA, Mattias Löw was a nominee and received honourable mention at the prestigious Diane Thomas Screenwriting Awards in 1997, presented by Steven Spielberg, Michael Douglas, Walter F. Parkes, Kathleen Turner and James L. Brooks.

Upon return to his native Sweden from Los Angeles in the late 1990s, Mattias turned to documentaries and has won acclaim from critics and audiences alike, and been the recipient of several international television, film and journalism awards as well as arts grants and stipends for his social-, educational- and sport-themed documentaries primarily made for Swedish public broadcaster SVT – Sveriges Television and Canadian public broadcaster CBC Television – Canadian Broadcasting Corporation.

2000s
Since 2008 Mattias Löw collaborates with Sweden's number one adventure destination, the ephemeral Ice Hotel in Jukkasjärvi, Swedish Laponia, making documentary shorts about the artists and designers creating a temporary hotel made out of snow and sculpted blocks of ice.

Throughout the 2000s, Mattias Löw conducted classes and workshops at various schools and universities, including a senior external lectureship with focus on documentary and ethnographic storytelling in the Faculty of Humanities at University of Copenhagen, in addition to lectures and workshops on storytelling for user experience and design at Umeå Institute of Design.

2010s
In June 2010 Mattias Löw released The Referee, a highly controversial SVT – Sveriges Television documentary film about the Swedish FIFA referee Martin Hansson and his tumultuous road to ref at the 2010 FIFA World Cup. Martin Hansson was the referee in the dramatic second of two 2009 Republic of Ireland v France football matches during the playoffs for the 2010 FIFA World Cup.

Mattias Löw's documentary TV-series The Other Sport made for SVT – Sveriges Television about the development of women's football since the 1960s was released in time for UEFA Women's Euro 2013 which was played in Sweden. The series centers around former and present football stars Pia Sundhage, Marta Vieira da Silva, Lotta Schelin, Kosovare Asllani, Gunilla Paijkull, Anette Börjesson and Elisabeth Leidinge among others. The three episode limited series attracted over a million TV-viewers in Sweden.

January 2015 Mattias Löw received Svenska Spel and the Swedish Sportjournalist Federation's Grant at the Swedish Sports Award – Svenska idrottsgalan.

In 2015, his documentary film All the World in a Design School created headlines and political debate as it criticized the introduction of steep tuition fees for non-European students at Swedish universities. The film follows a Turkish and a Chinese student during a study year at one of the world's top-ranked industrial design schools, UID – Umeå Institute of Design.

2016, Mattias Löw released the one-hour documentary The Indian Priest about Raphael Kurian, on a reverse mission. Raphael is a Catholic priest from Kerala in south India arriving in secular Sweden, and the documentary emphasizes the reversing of the direction of earlier missionary efforts.

Mattias Löw's photopoetry exhibition Aatman – The Universal Spirit with images from the annual Burning Man counterculture event in Black Rock Desert, Nevada debuted at Linköping Art Gallery in November 2018. The exhibition was the first large scale public art gallery display of photographs from Burning Man in Sweden. Part of the exhibition is on permanent display in Vallastaden, Linköping.

At the beginning of 2019 Mattias Löw guided a group of recently arrived refugees in a photography exhibition at Linköping Art Gallery. The works showed a reality of asylum seeking youth arriving in Sweden during the European migrant crisis.

2020s
In the wake of the COVID-19 pandemic in India Mattias Löw created the photo-essay exhibition 98 Days, dealing with worry, uncertainty and social distancing during the 2020 lockdown. A digital exhibition with online viewing rooms of the project first appeared at Fotografisk Center in Copenhagen, Denmark during June, 2020.

During July 2021, Swedish and Norwegian news media drew attention to the fact that Mattias Löw together with Academy Awards-nominated producer Mathias Fjellström is working on a documentary film about a red scarf, originally a gift from Skellefteå Municipality to relocated residents around Christmas 2017 that appeared on one of the insurgents during 2021 storming of the United States Capitol.

In February 2022, Swedish newspapers from Norrbotten reported that Mattias Löw was making a documentary TV-series for Sveriges Television about an opera diva from Tornedalen or Meänmaa, a culturally rich region at the border of Sweden and Finland.

In the summer of 2022, when the COVID-19 pandemic's restrictions were lifted, Mattias Löw exhibited photographs, essays and video works under the title Fångad i rädsla - Frozen in Fear about his experiences of worry, uncertainty and social distancing in India in the spring and summer of 2020.

Works

Exhibitions
 Aatman – The Universal Spirit, 2018
 98 Days, 2020
 Fångad i rädsla - Frozen in Fear, 2022
 Burning Man, Permanent Installation from 2022

Bibliography
 Aatman – The Universal Spirit, 2018

Filmography
 Wounderland, 2001
 Ice Carosello, 2010
 The Referee, 2010
 The Other Sport, 2013
 All the World in a Design School, 2015
 The Indian Priest, 2016
 The Tao of Cat, 2018
 Spruce Woods, 2019
 Frozen in Fear, 2022

Awards & Nominations
 IMDb Awards

References

External links

1970 births
Living people
Journalists from Stockholm
Swedish documentary film directors
Swedish documentary filmmakers
Swedish film directors
Swedish film producers
Swedish television directors
Swedish television producers
Swedish-language film directors
English-language film directors
Swedish cinematographers
21st-century Swedish journalists
Swedish television journalists
Swedish photographers